Tobia Lionelli (1647 – 17 October 1714) was a Slovene–Italian preacher and writer in the Baroque period. His sermons had a crucial role in the affirmation of Slovene as a language.

Life
Lionelli was born to a Slovene mother and an Italian father in the town of Sveti Križ (now Vipavski Križ) in the Vipava Valley, County of Gorizia. A recent theory conjectures that he was actually born as Ivan Hrobat, the illegitimate son of Katarina Hrobat and a nobleman of the Lanthieri family, and that the surname Lionelli was purchased to avoid embarrassment.

He took the name "Joannes Baptista à Sancta Cruce Vippacensi" upon joining the Order of Friars Minor Capuchin in reference to his native town and probably also to the Spanish mystic St. John of the Cross. He served in various monasteries in the Slovene Lands, including the Capuchin monastery of St. Francis Assisi in his native town, and in Croatia. Lionelli died in Gorizia, where he had spent the last years of his life.

Work
Lionelli wrote over 230 sermons, which he published in a series of five books entitled  (The Holy Handbook). The publication of these books was financed by members of the nobility and benefactors from within the Church.

Lionelli's Sacrum promptuarium was published between 1691 and 1707. The first two volumes were published in Venice, the remaining three in Ljubljana. They are written in the Brda dialect of Slovene, with strong influence of the neighbouring Inner Carniolan dialect, with numerous Germanisms and Latin quotations. The syntax presents a typical Baroque style, with references to Classical tradition.

References 

 Snoj, Marko (2006). Slovar jezika Janeza Svetokriškega (Dela, 49/7; 49/8). Ljubljana: Založba ZRC. 2 zv. .

External links 

Joannes Baptiſta à S. Cruce Vippacenſi. 1691. Sacrum promptuarium, Vol 2. Venice.
Joannes Baptiſta à S. Cruce Vippacenſi. 1696. Sacrum promptuarium, Vol 3. Ljubljana.
Joannes Baptiſta à S. Cruce Vippacenſi. 1707. Sacrum promptuarium, Vol 5. Ljubljana.
Janez Svetokriški A News Report by Jože Možina from a symposium on Janez Svetokriški. 1999. RTV Slovenia. 

1647 births
1714 deaths
17th-century Slovenian Roman Catholic priests
18th-century Slovenian Roman Catholic priests
Slovenian writers
Slovenian people of Italian descent
People from the Municipality of Ajdovščina
Capuchins
Sermon writers
Baroque writers
Slovenian Friars Minor